John Joseph Beck (January 8, 1900March 22, 1993) was a Michigan politician.

Early life
Beck was born in Ford City, Pennsylvania on January 8, 1900. Beck attended the University of Pittsburgh.

Career
Beck served as the deputy county clerk of Wayne County, Michigan for 11 years. In 1940, Beck ran for in the Democratic primary for the position of member of the Michigan House of Representatives from Wayne County 1st district, but was defeated. On November 4, 1952, Beck was elected to the Michigan House of Representatives where he represented the CWayne County 1st district from January 14, 1953 to 1954. In 1954 and 1956, Beck ran for the position of member of the Michigan House of Representatives from Wayne County 4th district, but was defeated both times.

Personal life
Beck was a member of St. Mary's Orthodox Church.

Death
Beck died on March 22, 1993 in Detroit, Michigan.

References

1900 births
1993 deaths
University of Pittsburgh alumni
Democratic Party members of the Michigan House of Representatives
People from Ford City, Pennsylvania
Politicians from Detroit
20th-century American politicians